Penstemon humilis is a species of flowering plant in the plantain family known by the common names low beardtongue and lowly beardtongue. It is native to the western United States.

The basal leaves form a mat about the base of the plant. The flowers are narrowly tubular.

This species of Penstemon is found in sagebrush, in pinyon-juniper woodland habitat, and in mountain forests and tundra.

References

External links
CalPhotos Photo Gallery

humilis
Flora of the Western United States